Ricardo Wright Herrero (April 3, 1943 – March 14, 2013), better known by his stage name Subas Herrero, was a Filipino actor, comedian and singer.

Early life
Subas Herrero was born on April 3, 1943 as Ricardo Wright Herrero in Manila.

Career
Herrero is best known for Champoy (1980–85), a Philippine gag show where he formed a Laurel and Hardy-like tandem with fellow Ateneo de Manila University alumnus and Filipino actor Noel Trinidad. Aside from television, Herrero also appeared in several films, which include Bakekang (1978), Karapatan ko ang pumatay... Kapitan Guti (1990), and Gao ya xian (1995). He played villain for several action stars like Fernando Poe, Jr., Ramon Revilla, Joseph Estrada and Rudy Fernandez in films and also co-starred in comedy films with Dolphy, Chiquito, Redford White and the trio of Tito, Vic and Joey.

In 1986, Herrero and Trinidad went live on Philippine television to call for the Filipino public to join the crowds at EDSA calling for the ouster of then-Philippine President Ferdinand Marcos. After the revolution, Herrero recorded Handog ng Pilipino sa Mundo (The Gift of the Filipinos to the World) along with 14 other Filipino artists to celebrate the peaceful revolt.

Herrero remained very active in showbusiness until he suffered from a stroke in 2000. Despite his subsequent state of health, he remained sporadically active and even took part in the EDSA Revolution of 2001, this time to call for the ouster of then-Philippine President Joseph Estrada and make a guest appearance in Bubble Gang'''s tribute to Champoy in 2003. Incidentally, Herrero previously appeared with Estrada in the films Erap Is My Guy (1973) and Diligin mo ng hamog ang uhaw na lupa'' (1975).

Personal life
Herrero was a practicing Roman Catholic. He was married to his wife Maripaz and had five children. Herrero moved to the United States in 2010.

Death
Herrero died in Rochester, New York on 14 March 2013 of heart failure caused by double pneumonia. He had used a wheelchair as a result of some mild strokes and other health issues caused by diabetes.

Filmography

Film

Television

References

External links

1943 births
2013 deaths
Ateneo de Manila University alumni
Filipino male comedians
Filipino expatriates in the United States
Filipino male film actors
Filipino male television actors
Filipino Roman Catholics
Filipino television personalities
Deaths from pneumonia in New York (state)
Male actors from Manila